N. C. Seneviratne was the 39th Surveyor General of Sri Lanka. He was appointed in 1993, succeeding S. Berugoda, and held the office until 1996. He was succeeded by M. P. Salgado.

References

S